Piotr Bajor (born 16 February 1960) is a Polish film actor. He starred in the film Chłopiec na galopującym koniu, which was screened out of competition at the 2006 Cannes Film Festival.

Filmography
 Memoirs of a Sinner (1986)
 The Boy on the Galloping Horse (2006)

References

External links
 

1960 births
Living people
Polish male film actors
People from Opole
20th-century Polish male actors